The Center for BrainHealth, part of The University of Texas at Dallas' school of Behavioral and Brain Sciences, is a research institute focused exclusively on brain health that combines brain research with clinical interventions. Founded by Dr. Sandra Bond Chapman in 1999, the Center for BrainHealth houses 125 researchers, postdoctoral research fellows, doctoral students, master's students, and research clinicians who work on 60 privately and federally funded research projects. The Center provides academic training and houses specialists in, among many others, Alzheimer's disease, traumatic brain injury (TBI), healthy brain aging, multiple sclerosis, autism, attention deficit hyperactivity disorder (ADHD), stroke, and posttraumatic stress disorder (PTSD).  To help raise awareness of and funding for research underway at the Center for BrainHealth, a number of proponent groups have formed. These include the Think Ahead Group (TAG) of young professionals and Friends of BrainHealth.

Research 

Researchers work side-by-side with clinicians. Brain scientists at the Center use technologies to elucidate how brain networks can be strengthened and reconnected, including electroencephalography (EEG) to record the brain's electrical rhythms during cognitive task performance, functional MRI (fMRI) scans to measure brain blood flow during cognitive tasks, an indicator of brain activity and brain morphometrics to measure size and shape differences of brain regions to millimeter accuracy. The Center houses specialists in various fields of neuroscience, and has produced publications from members of the BrainHealth Team. Research initiatives include:

History 

The Center for BrainHealth, part of The University of Texas at Dallas (UTD), was established in 1999 under the direction of Dr. Sandra Bond Chapman, UT Dallas' Dee Wyly Distinguished Chair in Brain Health. Originally located at UT Dallas' Callier Center for Communication Disorders, in 2004 the Texas Higher Education Coordinating Board approved the purchase and renovation of a nearby building at 2200 Mockingbird Lane in Dallas to be the Center's own facility. This facility is adjacent to the UT Southwestern North Campus. The Center's virtual lab is part of the National Pediatric Acquired Brain Injury Plan, and in 2004 the BrainHope Program was established for children with traumatic brain injuries. Also in 2004, Dee and Charles Wyly endowed the $2-million Dee Wyly Distinguished Chair at the Center and a $1.5-million gift from Sallie and Frederic B. Asche, Jr., to enable the establishment of the Sallie and Frederic B. Asche Jr. Advanced Treatment Wing at the Center for BrainHealth.
In 2005 the Center received a $2-million gift to endow a chair for the Center's medical science director. The Center's memory research initiatives were expanded in 2006 with $1 million to establish the Berman Laboratory for Learning and Memory and the Berman Scholars Program for young researchers doing postdoctoral training in memory. In 2007, businessman and philanthropist T. Boone Pickens donated $5 million to the Center for BrainHealth to fund educational and research initiatives in the area of brain science. In 2008, the Center's Middle School Brain Years project conducted the pilot study of its Strategic Memory and Reasoning Training (SMART) Program, an experimental curriculum designed to improve strategic reasoning skills in teens. The pilot study's success led to a $6 million grant from Texas Legislature for the project's expansion.

Facilities

The Center for BrainHealth is located in a  building designed by Kyley Harvey of HKS, Inc., on a  site near the UT Dallas' Callier Center for Communication Disorders and the University of Texas Southwestern Medical Center in the city of Dallas. In 2004, UT Dallas purchased a building with a $5 million donation from Dianne Cash. The new building was named the Frances and Mildred Goad Building in honor of Cash's mother, who benefited from the Center's efforts, and grandmother. Originally constructed in 1970, the redesign and remodel was an extensive undertaking that began in June 2005, completed in September 2006, with the building formally dedicated on January 26, 2007. Each floor of the facility is dedicated to carrying out one aspect of BrainHealth's mission and includes an auditorium, virtual classrooms, the T. Boone Pickens Virtual Learning Center, and a reception hall. The second floor contains computers and data analysis tools, as well as an outlet for brain scientists, engineers, and technology experts to explore data. The third floor houses clinically based research projects, including a facility for individuals to undergo brain fitness checkups for discovering ways to prevent memory decline and a place for adults and children to participate in research aimed at learning more about how to strengthen brain function after injury or disease. The Center for BrainHealth houses electroencephalography labs, data analysis tools, MRI machines, an rTMS (Repetitive Transcranial Magnetic Stimulation) lab, and brain morphometric laboratories.

Think Ahead Group 

Think Ahead Group (TAG) is a young professionals group based in Dallas, Texas, that raises awareness of brain health and funds for research taking place at the Center for BrainHealth.

The Think Ahead Group, founded in October 2009, now includes over 300 members. All contributions support the cause of brain health and the Center's many research focus areas-Alzheimer's disease, traumatic brain injury (TBI), autism, attention deficit hyperactivity disorder (ADHD), stroke, posttraumatic stress disorder (PTSD), addiction, BrainHealth physical, dementia, exercise and the brain, healthy brain aging, and virtual brain training.

Directors 
Sandra Bond Chapman, Ph.D. - Founder and Chief Director
John Hart, Jr., M.D. - Medical Science Director
Sarah Monning, M.B.A. - Community Relations Director

References

External links
 

University of Texas System
University of Texas at Dallas
Medical research institutes in Texas
Neuroscience research centers in the United States
Healthcare in Dallas
1999 establishments in Texas
Southwestern Medical District